Gletscherland, meaning "Glacier Land", is a peninsula in King Christian X Land, East Greenland. Administratively it is part of the Northeast Greenland National Park.

History 
This peninsula was named during the Three-year Expedition to East Greenland owing to it being largely glaciated. The name "Canton Land" has also been used.

Geography 
True to its name, Gletscherland is largely glaciated, with many ice caps and glaciers. It is located southwest of Suess Land, northwest of Lyell Land, and southeast of Goodenoughland. 
The peninsula has a mountainous, Alpine terrain; Mount Lugano is Gletscherland's highest point. The Cecilia Nunatak rises to the southwest.

It is bounded in the northwest by the Hisinger Glacier, in the north and northeast by the Dickson Fjord, in the southeast by the Rhedin Fjord, in the south by the Wahlenberg Glacier and to the west it is connected to the mainland. The Röhss Fjord and the valley at its head, almost divide the peninsula in two from ENE to WSW. All fjords are branches of the Kempe Fjord.

Bibliography
A. K. Higgins, Jane A. Gilotti, M. Paul Smith (eds.), The Greenland Caledonides: Evolution of the Northeast Margin of Laurentia.

References

External links
Journey across the nunataks of central east Greenland, 1951

Peninsulas of Greenland